Prince Anoushiravan Mirza "Zia' od-Dowleh" "Amir Touman" was a Persian prince of the Qajar dynasty, politician, and governor.

Life and career
Anoushiravan Mirza also written Anushirvan Mirza was born on 19 August 1833 at Ardabil, Iran, and died on 23 October 1899 in Tabriz after suffering from apoplexy and paralysis, bur. at Shusha, Karabakh. He was the first-born and eldest son of Prince Bahman Mirza, the governor-general (vali) of Azerbaijan in the time of Mohammad Shah Qajar. His mother was Bahman Mirza's first chief wife Princess Malek Soltan Khanom, daughter of Prince Mohammad Taghi Mirza "Hessam os-Saltaneh".
After Bahman Mirza fell out of favour at court in Tehran and exiled to Russia in 1848 his wives and children followed him to Russian occupied Caucasus province of Karabakh. But shortly after 1850 Anoushiravan Mirza moved back to Iran. And when his cousin Nasser al-Din Shah pardoned Bahman Mirza in 1872, finally Anoushiravan Mirza was rewarded with several governmental offices. In 1873 he became governor of Turshiz, 1878 governor of Talesh, later 1881-1882 governor of Tabriz, 1884-1886 and 1898-1899 of Semnan, Damghan and Shahrud, 1888-1889 governor of Borujerd and Lorestan. In 1891 he had the vizierate of the province of Kermanshah on behalf of the almighty governor and commander-in-chief of his time Hassan Ali Khan Garrousi “Amir Nezam”. He also received the title of Zia' od-Dowleh (lit. Splendour of the State) - which that he became well-known - and the military rank of Amir Touman (lit. Commander of Ten Thousand, i.e. general) by Nasser al-Din Shah.

Thomas Stevens 1887 told in his travel-diary Around the World on a Bicycle:"Prince Anushirvan Mirza, Governor of Semnan, Damghan, and Shahrood, is the Shah's cousin, son of Baahman Mirza, uncle of the Shah, and formerly Governor of Tabreez. Baahman Mirza was discovered intriguing with the Russians, and, fearing the vengeance of the Shah, fled from the country; seeking an asylum among the Russians, he is now--if not dead--a refugee somewhere in the Caucasus. But the father's disgrace did not prejudice the Shah against his sons, and Prince Anushirvan and his sons are honored and trusted by the Shah as men capable of distinguishing between the friends and enemies of their country, and of conducting themselves accordingly. The Governor's palace is not far from the north gate of the city, and after the customary round of tea and kalians, without which nothing can be done in Persia, he walks outside with his staff to a piece of good road in order to see me ride to the best advantage. (As a specimen of Persian extravagance--to use a very mild term--it may be as well to mention here as anywhere, that the Governor telegraphed to his son, acting as his deputy at Shahrood, that he had ridden some miles with me out of the city!) During the evening one of the Governor's sons, Prince Sultan Madjid Mirza, comes in with a few leading dignitaries to spend an hour in chatting and smoking. This young prince proves one of the most intelligent Persians I have met in the country; besides being very well informed for a provincial Persian, he is bright and quick-witted..."

Family and Offspring
Prince Anoushiravan Mirza married in 1850 as his first and chief wife (Persian: galin khanom) his cousin Badie ol-Jamal Khanom, daughter of Mohammad Hassan Khan Iravani by Princess Mahrokhsar Khanom "Fakhr od-Dowleh" (full-sister of Bahman Mirza). Secondly he married the daughter of Prince Amir Teymur Mirza Hessami, son of Mohammad Taghi Mirza "Hessam os-Saltaneh". 
He issued two sons and two daughters:
1. Prince Soltan Ahmad Mirza, he had issued:
1.1. Princess Benazir Khanom.
2. Prince Soltan Majid Mirza "Dar ol-Molk".
3. Princess Malekzadeh Khanom, she married Prince Shazdeh Mirza Bahrami "Sana' od-Dowleh" and issued:
3.1. Princess Monavvareh Khanom, she had issued.
3.2. Princess Moniere Khanom, she had issued.
4. Princess Malekeh Afagh Khanom Bahman, (b. 1864 at Tabriz, d. 26 Oct 1917 at Tehran), married ca. 1880 1rstly: Mirza Hossein Behnam; married 1898 2ndly: Amanollah Khan Zia' os-Soltan (d. 1931 at Hamburg) from the Donboli Khans of the Khoy Khanate. She had issued three sons and one daughter:
4.1. Shahzadeh Ali Akbar Bahman (1880-1964), he had issued:
4.1.1. Mehr-e Jahan Khanom Bahman.
4.2. Ali Asghar Bahman, he had issued:
4.2.1. Cyrus Bahman.
4.2.2. Talieh ol-Afagh Khanom Bahman.
4.2.3. Badie ol-Jamal Khanom II Bahman, who married into the Zarrinnaal family.
4.3. Nosrat ol-Molouk Khanom Bahman (1899-1972), who married into the Zarrinnaal family and issued:
4.3.1. Zarrin Rokh Zarrinkafsch-Bahman.
4.3.2. Ali Zarrinpour Zarrinkafsch-Bahman.
4.3.3. Abdol Hossein Amir Keywan Zarrinkafsch-Bahman.
4.3.4. Abolreza Anoushiravan II (died 1939).
4.4. Abolghassem Bahman (1902-1956).

References

Sources

Qajar princes
19th-century Iranian politicians
Bahmani family